Nicorandil is a vasodilatory drug used to treat angina.

Angina is chest pain that results from episodes of transient myocardial ischemia. This can be caused by diseases such as atherosclerosis, coronary artery disease and aortic stenosis. Angina commonly arises from vasospasm of the coronary arteries. There are multiple mechanisms causing the increased smooth muscle contraction involved in coronary vasospasm, including increased Rho-kinase activity. Increased levels of Rho-kinase inhibit myosin phosphatase activity, leading to increased calcium sensitivity and hypercontraction.  Rho-kinase also decreases nitric oxide synthase activity, which reduces nitric oxide concentrations. Lower levels of nitric oxide are present in spastic coronary arteries. L-type calcium channel expression increases in spastic vascular smooth muscle cells, which could result in excessive calcium influx, and hypercontraction.

It was patented in 1976 and approved for medical use in 1983.

Side effects 

Side effects listed in the British National Formulary include flushing, palpitations, weakness and vomiting. More recently, perianal, ileal and peristomal ulceration has been reported as a side effect. Anal ulceration is now included in the British National Formulary as a reported side effect. Other side effects include severe migraine, toothache, and nasal congestion.

Mechanism of action 
Nicorandil is an anti-angina medication that has the dual properties of a nitrate and ATP-sensitive  channel agonist. In humans, the nitrate action of nicorandil dilates the large coronary arteries at low plasma concentrations. At high plasma concentrations nicorandil reduces coronary vascular resistance, which is associated with increased ATP-sensitive  channel (KATP) opening.

Nicorandil stimulates guanylate cyclase to increase formation of cyclic GMP (cGMP). cGMP activates protein kinase G (PKG), which phosphorylates and inhibits GTPase RhoA and decreases Rho-kinase activity. Reduced Rho-kinase activity permits an increase in myosin phosphatase activity, decreasing the calcium sensitivity of the smooth muscle.

PKG also activates the sarcolemma calcium pump to remove activating calcium. PKG acts on  channels to promote K+ efflux and the ensuing hyperpolarization inhibits voltage-gated calcium channels. Overall, this leads to relaxation of the smooth muscle and coronary vasodilation.

The effect of nicorandil as a vasodilator is mainly attributed to its nitrate property. Yet, nicorandil is effective in cases where nitrates, such as nitroglycerine, are not effective. Studies show that this is due to its KATP channel agonist action which causes pharmacological preconditioning and provides cardioprotective effects against ischemia. Nicorandil activates KATP channels in the mitochondria of the myocardium, which appears to relay the cardioprotective effects, although the mechanism is still unclear. In experimental animal models of the Long QT syndrome, Nicorandil normalizes the prolonged cardiac action potential duration and the QT interval.

Society and culture

Brand names 
Nicorandil is marketed under the brand names Ikorel (in the United Kingdom, Australia and most of Europe), Angedil (in Romania, Poland), Dancor (in Switzerland), Nikoran, PCA (in India), Aprior (in the Philippines), Nitorubin (in Japan), and Sigmart (in Japan, South Korea, Taiwan and China). Nicorandil is not available in the United States.

Synthesis

Amide reaction between Nicotinoyl Chloride [10400-19-8] & 2-Aminoethyl Nitrate [646-02-6].

The reaction of N-(2-Hydroxyethyl)Nicotinamide [6265-73-2] with nitric acid gives nicorandil.

See also 
Nitrovasodilator

References

Further reading

 

Antianginals
Vasodilators
Nitrate esters
Merck brands
3-Pyridyl compounds
Nicotinamides
Potassium channel openers